John Sainty may refer to:

John Sainty (parliamentary official) (born 1934)
John Sainty (footballer) (born 1946)

See also
Sainty, a surname